The 1970 St. Louis Cardinals season was the team's 89th season in St. Louis, Missouri, and the 79th season in the National League. The Cardinals went 76–86 during the season and finished fourth in the National League East, 13 games behind the Pittsburgh Pirates. The season was also the first of 26 seasons for AstroTurf at Busch Memorial Stadium.

Offseason 
 October 7, 1969: Curt Flood, Byron Browne, Joe Hoerner, and Tim McCarver were traded by the Cardinals to the Philadelphia Phillies for Jerry Johnson, Dick Allen, and Cookie Rojas. Curt Flood refused to report to his new team. The Cardinals sent Willie Montañez to the Phillies on April 8, 1970, and Bob Browning (minors) to the Phillies on August 30, 1970, as compensation.
 January 17, 1970: Mike Tyson was drafted by the Cardinals in the 3rd round of the 1970 Major League Baseball Draft.
 March 31, 1970: Ramón Hernández was released by the Cardinals.

Curt Flood 
Curt Flood, because of a salary dispute with Gussie Busch, was traded after the 1969 season but refused to go to the Philadelphia Phillies and on January 16, 1970, filed a civil lawsuit to challenge baseball's reserve clause. The case eventually reached the Supreme Court and, though he lost, paved the way for free agency to change the game.

Regular season 
Bob Gibson won a Gold Glove and the Cy Young Award this year, with a 3.12 ERA, 23 wins, and 274 strikeouts. The Cardinals won only 76 games, their lowest total since the days of the 154-game schedule. Vic Davalillo had 24 pinch hits, breaking the National League record, and tying the Major League record set by Dave Philley in 1961.

Steve Carlton posted one game where he struck out 16 batters.

Third baseman Mike Shannon was limited to 52 games and soon would retire because of a kidney disease that threatened his life.

Season standings

Record vs. opponents

Opening Day starters 
Dick Allen
Lou Brock
José Cardenal
George Culver
Joe Hague
Julián Javier
Leron Lee
Dal Maxvill
Joe Torre

Notable transactions 
 May 19, 1970: Don Shaw was purchased by the Cardinals from the Montreal Expos.
 May 29, 1970: Phil Gagliano was traded by the Cardinals to the Chicago Cubs for Ted Abernathy.
 June 4, 1970: Bake McBride was drafted by the Cardinals in the 37th round of the 1970 Major League Baseball Draft.
 June 22, 1970: Chuck Hartenstein was selected off waivers by the Cardinals from the Pittsburgh Pirates.
 July 14, 1970: Chuck Hartenstein was sent by the Cardinals to the Boston Red Sox as part of a conditional deal.

Roster

Player stats

Batting

Starters by position 
Note: Pos = Position; G = Games played; AB = At bats; H = Hits; Avg. = Batting average; HR = Home runs; RBI = Runs batted in

Other batters 
Note: G = Games played; AB = At bats; H = Hits; Avg. = Batting average; HR = Home runs; RBI = Runs batted in

Pitching

Starting pitchers 
Note: G = Games pitched; IP = Innings pitched; W = Wins; L = Losses; ERA = Earned run average; SO = Strikeouts

Other pitchers 
Note: G = Games pitched; IP = Innings pitched; W = Wins; L = Losses; ERA = Earned run average; SO = Strikeouts

Relief pitchers 
Note: G = Games pitched; W = Wins; L = Losses; SV = Saves; ERA = Earned run average; SO = Strikeouts

Awards and honors 
1970 Major League Baseball All-Star Game
 Dick Allen
 Bob Gibson
 Joe Torre

Team award winners 
 Joe Torre and Bob Gibson, co-winners, St. Louis Baseball Man of the Year
 Jerry Reuss, St. Louis Cardinals Rookie of the Year

Farm system 

LEAGUE CHAMPIONS: Lewis-Clark

References

External links
1970 St. Louis Cardinals at Baseball Reference
1970 St. Louis Cardinals team page at www.baseball-almanac.com

St. Louis Cardinals seasons
Saint Louis Cardinals season
St Louis